William Amos (20 April 1860 – 14 May 1935) was an Australian cricketer from Adelaide. He played two first-class matches for South Australia between 1890 and 1893.

References

External links
 

1860 births
1935 deaths
Australian cricketers
South Australia cricketers
Cricketers from Adelaide